Toronto South was a federal electoral district represented in the House of Commons of Canada from 1904 to 1935. It was located in the city of Toronto in the province of Ontario. This riding was first created in 1903 from parts of Toronto Centre, Toronto East, West Toronto and York East ridings.

It initially consisted of the portion of the city of Toronto, including Toronto Island, lying west of the River Don and south of Queen Street. In 1924, it was redefined to consist of the part of the city of Toronto south of Dundas Street, west of Jarvis Street, and east of  Atlantic Avenue and Dovercourt Road, together with Toronto Island.

The electoral district was abolished in 1933 when it was redistributed between Spadina, St. Paul's and Trinity ridings.

Electoral history

|- 
  
|Conservative
|MACDONNELL, A.C.  
|align="right"| 3,501
  
|Liberal
|DEWART, H.H. 
|align="right"|3,092   
|}

|-
  
|Conservative
|MACDONNELL, A.C.   
|align="right"| 2,771 
 
|Labour
|O'DONOGHUE, John G. 
|align="right"|1,722
|}

|-
  
|Conservative
|MACDONNELL, A.C.  
|align="right"|  4,473
  
|Liberal
|WARD, John Joseph 
|align="right"|2,110
|}

|-
  
|Government
|SHEARD, Charles 
|align="right"| 7,469 

|Opposition-Labour
| CAREY, David Arthur
|align="right"| 2,365 
|}

|-
  
|Conservative
|SHEARD, Charles 
|align="right"| 4,056 
  
|Liberal
|MURDOCK, James  
|align="right"| 3,475
|}

|-
  
|Conservative
|GEARY, George Reginald  
|align="right"| 5,895 
  
|Liberal
|PEARCE, Claude Bereford  
|align="right"| 2,442 
 
|Independent
|MCEACHREN, Norman Charles 
|align="right"| 289   
|}

|-
  
|Conservative
|GEARY, George Reginald   
|align="right"|4,909 
  
|Liberal
|SHIPWAY, Thomas Henry  
|align="right"| 1,606   
|}

|-
  
|Conservative
|GEARY, George Reginald  
|align="right"| 4,635 
  
|Liberal
|MCINTYRE, Adam Gordon  
|align="right"|2,244 
 
|Labour
| ROMER, Jacob 
|align="right"| 730    
|}

See also 

 List of Canadian federal electoral districts
 Past Canadian electoral districts

External links 

 Website of the Parliament of Canada

Former federal electoral districts of Ontario
Federal electoral districts of Toronto